McCollum and Post Silk Mill is a historic silk mill located at Nazareth, Northampton County, Pennsylvania.  It was built in 1913, and is a two-story, rectangular brick industrial building measuring 51 feet, 6 inches, wide and 150 feet long. A one-story brick addition was built in 1967.  In 2001, it was adapted for use as an apartment building. It housed a silk mill, and later clothing manufacturers, until its conversion.

It was added to the National Register of Historic Places in 2005.

Gallery

References

Industrial buildings and structures on the National Register of Historic Places in Pennsylvania
Industrial buildings completed in 1913
Buildings and structures in Northampton County, Pennsylvania
Silk mills in the United States
1913 establishments in Pennsylvania
National Register of Historic Places in Northampton County, Pennsylvania